Kayla Tutino (born December 18, 1992) is a Canadian women's ice hockey player. Having played at the NCAA level with the Boston University Terriers women's ice hockey program, she was the first overall selection in the 2016 CWHL Draft, claimed by the Boston Blades. In 2017, Tutino was traded to the Les Canadiennes de Montréal. In 2018, Tutino announced her reitrment from professional hockey.

Playing career

NCAA
During her time with the Boston University Terriers, the program would win four consecutive Hockey East championships (2012–15). In the aftermath of the 2015 Hockey East tournament, Tutino joined Shannon Doyle and captain Marie-Philip Poulin on the All-Tournament Team.

CWHL
Tutino was drafted first overall by the Boston Blades in the 2016 CWHL Draft. She became the first female Boston University athlete to be selected first overall in a professional draft.

On April 25, 2017, Tutino was traded to the Les Canadiennes de Montréal in exchange for Nachi Fujimoto. On September 16, 2018, Tutino announced her retirement from professional hockey.

Career stats

Awards and honours
Most Valuable Player, Ontario Hockey Academy, 2010-11 season 
Hockey East Rookie of the Week (Week of October 17, 2011) 
Hockey East Player of the Week (Week of November 21, 2011)
Hockey East Rookie of the Week (Week of January 9. 2012) 
2014-15 Hockey East Second Team All-Star
2015 Hockey East All-Tournament Team

References

1992 births
Living people
Boston Blades players
Boston University Terriers women's ice hockey players
Canadian women's ice hockey forwards
Ice hockey people from Montreal
Canadian expatriate ice hockey players in the United States